Erdoğan Çınar is a Turkish writer known for promoting Ishikism. He has written extensively on Alevism, Bektashism, the history of religion, Turkish history and archaeology, and many other topics. Although proponents of Ishikism heavily depend on Erdoğan Çınar's works, others have criticized his works as historical revisionism or pseudohistory.

Views on Alevism
In 2004, Erdoğan Çınar published his seminal book Aleviliğin Gizli Tarihi ("The Secret History of Alevism"), which claimed that Alevism is in fact the oldest religion in the world. As the "First and True Religion" of the world, Çınar claims that Alevism is the main source of all other religions and beliefs in the world:

Çınar claims that the Luwians, Paulicians, Bogomils, Cathars, and other Gnostic groups were in fact Alevis. He identifies the legendary Alevi figure Pir Sultan Abdal as Constantine-Silvanus, the founder of Paulicianism. Thus, according to Çınar, the Paulicians and other Gnostic groups of the Byzantine Empire  were not actually Christians, but were in fact "Alevis" in the original sense. His 2007 book Aleviliğin Kayıp Bin Yılı (325-1325) discusses the "lost millenium" of Alevi history during the Byzantine Empire (325-1325 CE).

In the 2020 book Bronz Çağı’nda Alevilik, Erdoğan Çınar identifies some Anatolian Bronze Age civilizations (4000 BC-1750 BC) with Alevism.

Reception
Erdoğan Çınar's works and ideas have received mixed reception. Writers such as Haşim Kutlu strongly supported his ideas. Some Alevis were highly receptive towards his ideas, while others distanced themselves from them. Hamza Aksüt, an Alevi historian, criticized his ideas as pseudohistory. Another writer, Ünsal Öztürk, has also criticized Erdoğan Çınar. In 2010, Hamza Aksüt, Hasan Harmancı, and Ünsal Öztürk published the book Alevi Tarih Yazımında Skandal – Erdoğan Çınar Örneği (A Scandal in Alevi History Writing – The Erdoğan Çınar Example), which criticizes Erdoğan Çınar's ideas as historical revisionism.

Books
Books by Erdoğan Çınar:

 ("The Secret History of Alevism")
 ("The Lost Alevi Legend")
 ("The Lost Millennium of Alevism: 325-1325")
 ("The Roots of Alevism: The Esotericism of Abdal Musa")
 ("We Have a Rose in the Garden")
 ("The Secret of Dergah: The Lost Story of Alevism")
 ("Alevism in the Bronze Age (4000 BC-1750 BC): The Lost Story of Alevism, Second Book")

References

Living people
21st-century Turkish writers
Turkish male writers
Alevism
History of the Alevis
Historians of religion
Year of birth missing (living people)
Turkish Alevis